The 1896 Texas gubernatorial election was held to elect the Governor of Texas. Governor Charles Culberson was re-elected to a second term over Jerome C. Kearby, a Populist running with Republican support.

The total vote recorded in the general election was nearly 540,000 and the most for any Texas election until the 1918 Democratic Party primary.

General election

Candidates
Randolph Clark, founder of Texas Christian University (Prohibition)
Charles Culberson, incumbent Governor (Democratic)
Jerome Claiborne Kearby, Dallas attorney and candidate for U.S. Representative in 1894 (Populist)

Results

References

Further reading

1896
Texas
1896 Texas elections